California Free State is a 1996 role-playing game supplement for Shadowrun published by FASA.

Contents
California Free State is an area sourcebook that focuses on California.

Reception
Andy Butcher reviewed California Free State for Arcane magazine, rating it a 9 out of 10 overall. Butcher comments that "Regardless of what style of game you play [...] California Free State has a great deal to offer any Shadowrun group. Excellent stuff."

Reviews
Shadis #27 (May, 1996)

References

Role-playing game supplements introduced in 1996
Shadowrun supplements